Johannes von Soest or Johann von Soest may refer to:

Johann von Soest (painter)
Johannes von Soest, or Johann Steinwert von Soest, poet